Henry Jacob Goetzman (born May 10, 1864, in Rochester, New York) was an American photographer that had a photographic studio with his wife in Dawson City in the Yukon Territory, Canada during the end of the 19th and early 20th centuries during the Klondike Gold Rush. The studio he established in Dawson City lasted from 1898 to 1904. Goetzman's wife Mary W. and daughter Edith were involved in his business. Edith attended Snell Seminary in California and Mary Goetzman sent her letters on birchbark.

Collections
Orbis Cascade Alliance has a collection of his work.

Yale University's photo collection includes photographs credited to M.W. Goetzman that show the store and equipment being sold as well as photographic portraits believed to be of Mary, likely by Henry.

William E. Meed collected the Goetzmans' work along with photographs from other Yukon Gold Rush era photographers.

See also
Eric A. Hegg

References

1864 births
Year of death missing
19th-century American photographers
20th-century American photographers
American expatriates in Canada
People from Rochester, New York
Photographers from New York (state)